Daniele Compatangelo (born November 15, 1975) is an Italian journalist. He lives in the United States.

Biography 
Compatangelo was born in Savona and raised in Torino, Italy where he studied at Collegio San Giuseppe. He attended the University of Torino, where he graduated in 2003 in law with a thesis on the "Reform of CONI" (the Italian National Olympic Committee).

He became a member of the Italian Press Bar Association in 2008 (Ordine dei Giornalisti di Torino – Professionista). He is one of the correspondents from the United States, for Italian media outlet RTI Reti Televisive Italiane Mediaset. He is also known for his coverage from the US Senate for the Italian news show Mezz'ora in Più Il Mondo che Verrà.

Thanks to his news reports in March 2020 he become Associated Member at the White House Correspondent  Association WHCA in Washington DC.

He is also known in Italy for becoming the first Italian journalist to have interviewed the 46th President of the United States Joe Biden

Career

Early career 
In the late 1990s, he began freelancing in media relations at the FIS Alpine Ski World Cup in Sestriere. He later continued working in media relations in 30 different sporting events around the world, such as the FIS Alpine World Ski Championships in Sestriere (1997), Vail – Colorado (1999), Bormio – Italy (2005); the International Track and Field Meeting in different locations (1994–2000), the Gerald Ford Golf Tournament in Vail – Colorado (1998), the National Basketball Association Europe Live Tour (2007) and the 2007 Winter Universiade in Torino.

In 2006, he was hired by NBC Universal as bureau coordinator and producer at the 2006 Winter Olympics in Torino. Together with the Olympic production team, he organized NBC's on-air broadcasting studio and facilities. Later on, he covered, as reporter the 2008 Summer Olympics in Beijing while at 2010 Winter Olympics in Vancouver, he was hired as one of the managers of the International Broadcast Centre. His last coverage the 2012 Summer Olympics in London.

In the fall of 2008 he worked as sport correspondent at Infront Media at that year Alpine Ski World Cup season and the same year, he began freelancing for Italian daily newspaper "Il Secolo XIX" covering events such as the FIS Alpine Ski World Cup, the Mediterranean Games in Pescara and the FIS Alpine World Ski Championships 2009 in Val-d'Isère.

In 2011, his documentary "The Los Angeles Break Down" about the tragic and uncontrolled homeless crises in Los Angeles was nominated at the Southern California Journalism Awards.

The coverage of the January 6th and the interview with President Joe Biden 

His career had a breakthrough during the January 6, 2020 insurrection in Washington DC, when Italian broadcaster SkyTg24 asked him to cover the 2020 Presidential Election. At that time he was the only Italian correspondent  reporting Live from the US Capitol when the mobs stormed the Parliament.

Thanks to his outstanding news coverage of the attack, Italian news show Mezz'Ora in Più il Mondo che Verrà on Italian television RAI , called him to work for the show from the US Parliament, where a year later, on January 6, 2022, he became the first and only Italian journalist to interview the 46th President of the United States Joe Biden, on the anniversary of the insurrection.

2012 – present 

While in Los Angeles for a decade he has covered The Oscars, the Golden Globes and the Critics Choice Awards and dozens of press junkets from the Studios, interviewing the main Hollywood celebrities, making him one the most recognizable reporter of the Hollywood Entertainment in Italy on for RTI Mediaset  Studio Aperto Nightly News and the Italian Today Show Mattino Cinque. He also contributed to the Swiss station RSI News and the Italian newspaper "Corriere della Sera".

During the 2015 San Bernardino attack, Compatangelo was the first Italian journalist to report live on Rai News24 and the Italian today Show Mattino Cinque, from the Greater Los Angeles area, and the following year he covered the 2016 United States presidential election.

Compatangelo was recognized for his remarkable coverage on Sky TG24 . of the dramatic  2017 Las Vegas shooting.

He was also acclaimed for his news stories from the Jet Propulsion Laboratory NASA in Pasadena about the Voyager spacecraft with the interview with his inventor Ed Stone; the Rover Perseverance in 2020, and his interview with astronauts  Kjell Lindgren about the Artemis II Mission to the Moon all aired on Italian Nightly News on RTI Studio Aperto Mag.

In Calabasas, California, he has covered the tragic death of Kobe Bryant and his was the first Italian reporter to break the story live to the Italian audience in Europe.

Since 2020 he has interviewed dozens of  American politicians from the White House and the US Senate, such as Former US State Secretary Mike Pompeo, Leon Panetta former CIA Director and Secretary of State under President Barak Obama,  The Chairman of the Us Senate Foreign Relation Committee Robert Menedez, The President of US Senate Intelligence Committee Mark Warner and the Vice Chairman Marco Rubio and many others.

In 2022 he was acclaimed in Italy for his interview with Oksana Markarova the Ukrainian Ambassador to the United States.

On January 6, 2022, he became the first Italian journalist to interview the 46th President of the United States Joe Biden, in the anniversary of the insurrection.

He was recognized in Italy in different occasions, thanks to his interviews with former House Speakers Nancy Pelosi and the current House Speaker Kevin McCarthy on geopolitical and foreign relations issues.

References 

Italian journalists
Italian male journalists
1975 births
Entertainment journalists
Reporters and correspondents
Living people